Thomas Heath Haviland (13 November 1822 – 11 September 1895) was a Canadian lawyer, politician and father of Canadian Confederation. He was born in, and died in Charlottetown, Prince Edward Island. He was appointed to the Senate of Canada on 18 October 1873, and represented Prince Edward Island as a Conservative until his resignation on 1 July 1879.

He was born in Charlottetown, the son of Thomas Heath Haviland Sr., and was educated in Belgium. On his return, he studied law and was called to the bar in 1846. In 1847, he married Anne Elizabeth Grubbe. He was elected to the Legislative Assembly of Prince Edward Island for Georgetown and Royalty in 1846 and served until 1876. Haviland served in the provincial Executive Council from 1859 to 1862, from 1865 to 1867 and from 1870 to 1872. From 1863 to 1864, he was speaker for the assembly. He was also a colonel in the local militia. Haviland served as the third Lieutenant Governor of Prince Edward Island from 1879 to 1884. In 1886, he became mayor of Charlottetown after the death of Henry Beer, serving until 1893 when he retired due to poor health. Haviland died in Charlottetown two years later.

Haviland was a Freemason of Victoria Lodge No. 383 (Scotland).

References

External links
Biography at the Dictionary of Canadian Biography Online

Government of Prince Edward Island - Thomas Heath Haviland article

1822 births
1895 deaths
Canadian Anglicans
Canadian senators from Prince Edward Island
Fathers of Confederation
Lawyers in Prince Edward Island
Lieutenant Governors of Prince Edward Island
Conservative Party of Canada (1867–1942) senators
Speakers of the Legislative Assembly of Prince Edward Island
Mayors of Charlottetown
Persons of National Historic Significance (Canada)
Colony of Prince Edward Island people
Canadian Freemasons